Karankasso is a village in southwestern Burkina Faso along a main road 45 kilometres away from Bobo-Dioulasso. Reports on malaria in young children have been carried out in Karankasso showing a large difference in infection rates between wet and dry seasons. Karankasso is the largest community home to the Sambla people, it has a health center but healthcare has been reported to be poor in Karankasso. In 1993, 25 people died of measles in Karankasso. Karankasso's population does not have access to electricity, phone lines or education, so many people use radios instead. Karankasso's people mainly use bicycles or bush-taxis for transportation

References 

Villages in Burkina Faso